Omar Abdulla Al Futtaim is an Emirati businessman, the CEO and vice-chairman of Al-Futtaim Group, owned by his father, the billionaire Abdulla Al Futtaim.

Early years and education
Al Futtaim has a bachelor's degree in Economics and Business Studies from Macalester College, Minnesota, received in 1985.
The group was founded in the 1930s and expanded rapidly in the 1940s and 1950s becoming an integrated commercial, industrial, and services organization.[2] 

The Al-Futtaim family split its business interests in 2000 with Abdulla Al Futtaim controlling the automotive and mainly retail business, and his cousin Majid controlling a property development business (now known as Majid Al Futtaim Group).[3]

Career
Al Futtaim was appointed as Vice Chairman of Orient Insurance in 2001.  Since 2010 he has served as chairman of Emirates Investment Bank and Al Futtaim HC Securities, vice chairman of Orient Insurance, and a director of the Commercial Bank of Dubai. He is also a Board Member of the Dubai Chamber of Commerce and Industry and a Member of the Dubai Economic Council and Emirates National Development Program.

References

Living people
Emirati businesspeople
Year of birth missing (living people)
Macalester College alumni